The 2019–20 Western Carolina Catamounts men's basketball team represented Western Carolina University in the 2019–20 NCAA Division I men's basketball season. The Catamounts, led by second-year head coach Mark Prosser, played their home games at the Ramsey Center in Cullowhee, North Carolina, as members of the Southern Conference. They finished the season 19–12, 10–8 in Southern Conference play to finish in a tie for fifth place. They defeated Mercer in the quarterfinals of the Southern Conference tournament before losing in the semifinals to East Tennessee State.

Previous season

The Catamounts finished the 2018–19 season 7–25, 4–14 in Southern Conference play to finish in a three-way tie for eighth place. In the Southern Conference tournament, they were defeated by VMI in the first round.

Offseason

Player departures

Recruiting Class of 2019

Roster

Schedule and results

|-
!colspan=12 style=| Regular season

|-
!colspan=12 style=| Southern Conference tournament
|-

|-

Source

References

Western Carolina Catamounts men's basketball seasons
Western Carolina Catamounts
Western Carolina Catamounts men's basketball
Western Carolina Catamounts men's basketball